The 1995 Wisconsin–La Crosse Eagles football team represented the University of Wisconsin–La Crosse as a member of the Wisconsin State University Conference (WSUC) during the 1995 NCAA Division III football season. In their 27th season under head coach Roger Harring, the Eagles compiled a 14–0 record (7–0 against conference opponents) and won the WSUC championship.

The team played its home games at Veterans Memorial Stadium in La Crosse, Wisconsin.

Schedule

Roster

References

Wisconsin-La Crosse
Wisconsin–La Crosse Eagles football seasons
NCAA Division III Football Champions
College football undefeated seasons
Wisconsin–La Crosse Eagles football